Latex Generation is a punk rock band formed during the early 1990s in New York. The band's name was inspired by a news report on STDs, the AIDS epidemic, and the threat it could pose to the current generation of teens.

Over the years, Latex Generation has released 2 full-length CDs, three 7-inch records, a number of compilation album contributions, and has toured extensively throughout North America, Europe, and Australia, most notably on the Van's Warped Tour.

Name
In addition to the news report that inspired it, there have been various theories on the development of Latex Generation's name. The name has been said to be a play on words as the "Late X Generation" because the members all fall age-wise at the tail end of Generation X. Any reference to being late was because Tom and Paul are always late, which often made the entire band late for gigs and commitments. In fact, being late was the first stereotype established by Paul and Tom for Czech people, who otherwise don't have any established stereotypes . The band are also referred to as "L8XG" or just "LG".

The Early Years (1990-1992)

The founding members were:

Paul Fort (guitar)
Mike Hobbs (drums)
Tommy Rockstar (bass)

At the beginning, the band performed at high school functions. No frontmen were available at this time, so friends and family members took to the stage along with the band. The band soon recruited a guitarist, James Simpson, to fill out the stage with live sound. However, Simpson's role within the band was short lived due to personality clashes with other band members. More specifically, it was reported that he punched Tommy Rockstar in the face after a Battle of the Bands session at Wheatley High School. He was removed from the band after the incident.

Soon after, vocalist Matt Small was recruited. Matt fronted the band for a few shows, including one at Long Island's HammerHedz, the Vault in Queens (NYC), & the Wheatley High's Battle of the Bands. The Wheatley battle of the band's show incited an infamous mosh pit that brought the show to a halt twice and led to the school principal ejecting the band's fans, resulting in a disappointing loss in the contest. The band realized that Matt's singing didn't fit their style and his stint as lead singer ended rather quickly.

After several unsuccessful auditions, the band approached Joseph Nienstedt, guitarist for another local band called "Old Motor Parkway." Joe became the new singer for the band and they immediately began working on original songs. Among the early originals were: "Out on the Run," "Bitch Factory," and "Edicius." The band started to play regular shows throughout Long Island and Queens and even won the Herricks High School Battle of the Bands.

The line-up was as follows:

Paul Fort (guitars)
Mike Hobbs (drums)
Tommy Rockstar (bass guitars)
Joseph Nienstedt (vocals)

Recording Session No. 1

Latex Generation recorded a demo entitled Loser with local producer Steve Ronsen.
The six song demo included:

 Myself
 Funky Green Carpet
 Not a Crime
 Whore
 Grow
 FCC

The Middle Years (1993-1996)
The band became actively involved in the Long Island/Queens Punk/Hardcore scene which was centered around the popular club "The Angle" (Mineola, New York). These club appearances led to the band signing with indie label Motherbox Records.
Motherbox helped fund and distribute the band's first 7-inch record entitled "Bored" (1993).

Recording Session No. 2

The Bored 7-inch was recorded by Steve Ronsen at Buzz Productions. Songs Included:

 PB&J
 Home
 Bored
 Two Faces

The song "Two Faces" featured Joe playing guitar alongside Paul for the first time. Impressed with the results of the session, the band decided a role shift would benefit everyone involved and Joe took on the lead guitar role allowing Paul to concentrate on lead vocals.

In an attempt to broaden their fan base, the band purchased a van and worked hard expanding their influence into New Jersey and Pennsylvania. These shows led to strong relationships with bands such as Weston (band), Bouncing Souls, Plow United, Nooner & Grady. During this time, the band tightened up and headed back to the studio.

Recording Session No. 3

The I Killed the President 7-inch was recorded by Steve Ronsen at Buzz Productions.
Songs Included:

 Fuck Me, I'm a Rockstar
 Delivery Boy
 I Killed the President

With two 7-inch records to their credit, the band grew more ambitious. Longer tours were now being organized throughout the Northeast and larger groups of fans were attending shows. The band's buzz grew with each month and requests were coming in from minor labels to provide new songs for upcoming compilations. At the same time, the group continued its DIY philosophy by silk-screening their own T-shirts, buttons, and patches.

Recording Session No. 4

Although the band was satisfied with the early home studio recordings done at Buzz Studios, they felt it was time to record in a more professional environment. They were introduced to engineer/producer Steve Meyer in 1995 and recorded four songs for upcoming compilations.

Known as the Steve Meyer sessions, it included the following songs:

 Daddy Was a Communist
 I'm Not You
 The Theme from TV's The Jeffersons (Cover)
 Runaround Sue (Cover)

Latex was now playing shows with larger bands in the NYC punk scene. This paid off in a big way after playing a sold out show supporting CA's No Use For a Name at the Wetlands in NYC. Soon after, the band was approached by a New Zealand-based record label called "Onefoot Records", with whom they signed a worldwide recording and distribution contract.

Recording Session No. 5

The 360 CD & LP was recorded by Steve Meyer and included all new recordings of the following songs:

 Central America
 Daddy Was a Communist
 They Killed the Radio
 360
 Delivery Boy
 PB&J
 3 Years After
 Fuck Me, I'm a Rockstar
 I'm Not You
 I Killed the President
 Bazooka
 Fallen Angel (with hidden track "Sgt. Thrasher" afterwards)

Latex Generation then organized its most ambitious tour to date. With record label backing and a new CD to promote, the band embarked on a seven-week US tour. The band continued its DIY work ethic by making almost all of their own merchandise, booking shows, advertising, and managing themselves. This required a monumental effort and put a strain on the relationships between members.

The Later Years (1997-1999)

After returning from a tour in support of 360˚, the band brought on new friend Hugo Lowbrow as a 2nd guitar player. When drummer Mike Hobbs & singer Paul Fort left for college in the fall, the group viewed it as a much needed break from band tensions/pressures. However, the distance between members only fueled the existing fires, and, after much debate, Tom & Joe finally decided it was better to move on and replaced Hobbs with Hugo Lowbrow as their new drummer. Soon after, Paul Fort would leave the band, changing the face of the line-up as well as the sound of the band.

The remaining members tried out various frontmen but no one suitable was found. Joseph Nienstedt eventually reclaimed the lead singer position he occupied when the band was first formed. The band continued touring under the name "Latex Generation", now with the following members:

Joseph Nienstedt: Vocals/Guitar
Tommy Rockstar: Bass
Hugo Lowbrow: Drums

With a full catalog of music, the band got back on the road playing alongside Florida's Ska/Punk kings Less Than Jake on an impromptu East Coast tour.  They soon recorded some new material for a new 7-inch single, as well as a few tracks for their follow up record to 360˚.

The band members had changed, and so did their sound. In a final transition from old to new, the band changed studio engineers again.

Recording Session No. 6

During the Eric Rachel sessions (Tracks East Studios, NJ) they recorded the following songs:

For the Whatever Happened to PJ Soles? 7-inch

 Whatever Happened to PJ Soles?
 Come Along Sorry Ass, We're Going Places (which also appeared on "Boysrock")

For compilation records:

 21 (of age) (which also appeared on "Boysrock" and the "Boysrock Sampler" cassette)
 Cycle (which also appeared on "Boysrock" and the "Boysrock Sampler" cassette)
 Holiday Road (which was never released)

Overseas

With heavy support from their record label, Latex Generation embarked on their first international tour to Europe with label-mates, Radio Baghdad.  The tour was a gritty yet successful endeavor, playing to a foreign "grass roots" audience which varied from city to city, and included performances at venues such as at government-supported squat houses, indoor pools, night clubs, disco-techs, farms, army camps, and more. Some highlights from the tour included nightly "jams" with tour-mates RadioBaghdad, who often covered rock classics such as '99 Red Balloons' (sung in German and English) and 'Stepping Stone'. The tour would help give the band memorable experiences that would later materialize in song-form on their next record.

Latex Generation was featured in video documentary filmed during that tour (European release only) and some material was recorded for the documentary appeared in a short video clip on their "Boysrock" CD.

Upon returning from the European tour, L8XG parted ways with Hugo Gasc (who remained a close friend and played an occasional show with them as a guitarist) due to his commitment to his own band Desperosity. L8XG began to audition new drummers and found a drummer named Jay who played their first Vans Warped Tour shows as well as a nationwide tour with the band Whatever?. However, the band did not have the same chemistry achieved with Hugo, so they parted ways with Jay on good terms, with Jay going on to play with other groups - most notably, Long Island's wildly successful hardcore outfit Bayside. Ensuing auditions produced drummer Brian Alien. To make up for lost time, the band immediately began writing for a new record and went back to Tracks East in NJ to lay down what would be "Boysrock", their second CD.

The lineup for Boysrock was as follows:

Joseph Nienstedt (Vocals/Guitar)
Tommy Rockstar (Bass)
Brian Alien (aka: Alien) (Drums)

Latex Generation was a completely different band by the time they recorded Boysrock. They had been through numerous line-up changes and had matured greatly since the early days. The end result was a record that sounded nothing like their previous recordings. Fans of the older material had mixed reactions to the shift in style demonstrated on Boysrock and the band found themselves playing less and less of the old material live. The recording showed the bands versatility & passion, and has since become regarded as their "Pet Sounds".

Recording Session No. 7

The songs that appeared on Boysrock Latex Generation's 2nd CD, were:

 Laugh It Off
 6th Sense
 21 (of age) (recorded with Hugo on drums from the previous session)
 Cycle (recorded with Hugo on drums from the previous session)
 Tank Stellar
 One For the Bastards
 Come Along Sorry Ass, We're Going Places (recorded with Hugo on drums from the previous session)
 Ilona Stanley's Response
 Inspiration on TV
 Desperosity ( with Jessica Mills on Saxophone - formerly of Less than Jake)
 Mac ( with Jessica Mills on Saxophone - formerly of Less than Jake, this song was written by Patrick Walsh)
 Campsite 54

Other songs recorded during that session (but not included on the album) include:

 Closed Casket (pulled from Boysrock at the last minute and later commercially released on a Onefoot Records CD Compilation)
 Trash (with Hugo Lowbrow on lead vocals and rhythm guitar)

After they recorded Boysrock, the band performed on a variety of short tours in the US, including a slot on a tour supporting The Bouncing Souls, a tour with Pennsylvania's Digger, and a string of dates on the Vans Warped Tour in the US.  They headed to a studio in South Carolina to record 2 songs for the record label Fast Music that were to appear on a split 7-inch record with the band Digger. The 7-inch never came to fruition, but one of the songs was released on a compilation for the label Fast Music.

Recording Session No. 8

The Columbia, SC sessions included the following songs:

 Undependant (released on the Fast Music Compilation)
 The Best Revenge (never commercially released)

Latex Generation (1998 to 2006)

After years of hard work, touring and self-promotion, L8XG was offered a slot on the Australian leg of the 1998 Van's Warped Tour.  The feat was considered to be one of the bands crowning achievements, as they were asked to play the main stage of the tour, alongside acts such as Suicidal Tendencies,
Less Than Jake, the Deftones, MxPx, 22 Jacks, Cherry Poppin' Daddies, HepCat, Pennywise, Area 7, GrinSpoon, Frenzal Rhomb, Unwriten Law and many more.

The tour, which spanned the month of January 1999 (even though it was the '98 Warped Tour, the tour lasted until January), provided the band the luxury of reaching out to large audiences on a daily basis (performing in front of as many as 15,000 people).

Upon return, Latex Generation was offered a tour, supporting pop-punk legends Lagwagon (Fat Wreck Chords) and Colorado punk icons ALL.

Shortly after, singer Joseph Nienstedt got married. At the same time, the band was having difficulties with drummer Brian Alien. Brian Alien and Latex Generation decided to split ways. They have since rekindled their friendship and have remained friendly over the years, with Alien going on to join various other projects, such as Today is the Day, Disassociate, and even a stint with Kiss Army.

Life changed for Joe who fathered his first child, while Tommy Rockstar started his own T-shirt printing business. By the summer of 1999, the two decided to put the band 'on hold indefinitely' and the band has remained until it reunited in late 2006.

..meanwhile Paulie Latex has secretly been crafting his debut solo album code named "1.21 gigawatts" which in the spirit of PiL v Sex Pistols will take fans into the next generation (pun intended) of bodaciousness.

Reunions

In December 2004, Joe, Tommy & Hugo got together at a party for friends in Long Island City, NYC to play a song for their friends. It was the song "21 (of age)".
In December 2006, Latex Generation reunited for a pair of shows with an also reunited Weston in New York and Pennsylvania.  Latex Generation's lineup for these shows included Joe, Tommy, & Hugo as well as former roadie Brian Gallagher on 2nd guitar.  The dates were 12/30/06 at Rebel in NYC and 12/31/06 at Crocodile Rock in Allentown, PA.  Some of the performances can be viewed on YouTube

Digital Music Releases

In late 2006, Latex Generation released digital download-only versions of their 2 full-length studio recordings "360°" & "Boysrock". Entitled "360° (Special Edition)" and "Boysrock (Special Edition)", the 2 collections feature B-Sides and rarities previously unavailable commercially.

The Track Listings are as follows:

360° (Special Edition)
 Central America
 Daddy Was a Communist
 They Killed the Radio
 360
 Delivery Boy
 PB&J
 3 Years After
 Fuck Me, I'm a Rockstar
 I'm Not You
 I Killed the President
 Bazooka
 Fallen Angel (with the hidden track "Sgt. Thrasher" afterwards)
 Daddy Was a Communist (Demo)
 I'm Not You (Demo)
 Runaround Sue
 The Jeffersons
 PB&J (Original Version Remix)

Boysrock (Special Edition)
 Laugh It Off
 6th Sense
 21 (of age)
 Cycle
 Tank Stellar
 One For the Bastards
 Come Along Sorry Ass, We're Going Places
 Ilona Stanley's Response
 Inspiration on TV
 Desperosity
 Closed Casket
 Mac
 Campsite 54
 Whatever Happened to PJ Soles?
 Holiday Road

The Special Editions are only available on digital download services worldwide such as iTunes, Rhapsody, Napster, & more.

External links

Punk rock groups from New York (state)